David J. Asher (born 1966, Edinburgh) is a British astronomer, who works at the Armagh Observatory (IAU code 981) in Northern Ireland. 
He studied mathematics at Cambridge and received his doctorate from Oxford. 
He is known for the meteor research that he conducts with Robert McNaught.
In 1999 and 2000, they accurately gauged when the Leonids meteor shower would peak, while underestimating the peak intensities.

The Mars-crosser asteroid 6564 Asher, discovered by Robert McNaught in 1992, was named in his honor.

References

External links 
 David Asher at star.arm.ac.uk

1966 births
21st-century British astronomers
20th-century British astronomers
Discoverers of asteroids
Living people